Longfeng Baochai Yuan is a wuxia novel by Liang Yusheng first published as a serial between 25 June 1964 and 15 May 1966 in the Hong Kong newspaper Ta Kung Pao. The second part of a trilogy, the novel is preceded by Datang Youxia Zhuan and followed by Huijian Xinmo.

Plot 
The novel is set in China during the Tang dynasty against the backdrop of the rebellion against the Tang government (755–763) by An Lushan, and serves as a continuation of the previous novel Datang Youxia Zhuan.

Duan Guizhang and Shi Yiru had arranged for their respective children to be married if they were of opposite sexes. A pair of ornamental hairpins, the titular Dragon and Phoenix Hairpins, were exchanged by both sides as a token of their agreement; the Duans kept the Dragon Hairpin while the Shis had the Phoenix Hairpin. Earlier in Datang Youxia Zhuan, Shi Yiru had committed suicide while he was held captive by An Lushan, and Duan Guizhang had been killed in battle during the Siege of Suiyang. Duan Guizhang's wife, Dou Xianniang, had survived the battle but died of illness shortly after. Their son, Duan Keye, had been raised by Xia Lingshuang. Shi Yiru's daughter, Shi Ruomei, had been renamed Hongxian and had been adopted by Xue Song, one of An Lushan's subordinates. Xue Song had later surrendered to the Tang government and become the military governor of Luzhou.

When Duan Keye turns 16, Xia Lingshuang relates his parents' story to him, passes him the Dragon Hairpin, and tells him to find his missing fiancée and marry her. At the same time, Xue Song betroths Hongxian to the eldest son of Tian Chengsi, the treacherous military governor of Weibo, who is trying to pressure Xue Song into allying with him. When Tian Chengsi sends betrothal gifts to Xue Song, Duan Keye and the outlaws on Golden Rooster Ridge ambush the convoy and rob the gifts. Out of curiosity, Duan Keye breaks into Xue Song's residence and encounters Hongxian. A fight breaks out and they have misunderstanding since Hongxian is unaware of her true parentage. Hongxian's adoptive mother reveals the truth to her daughter later.

To repay her adoptive parents' kindness, Hongxian breaks into Tian Chengsi's residence and steals a box from his bedside. Unknown to her, Duan Keye also infiltrates Tian Chengsi's residence that night and his misunderstanding with Hongxian deepens when he mistakenly thinks she is helping his enemy. After Tian Chengsi withdraws his forces from Luzhou, Hongxian leaves her adoptive parents and assumes her true identity as Shi Ruomei. She encounters Nie Yinniang, her childhood friend, and Mou Shijie, the young master of Fusang Island. The three of them travel to Golden Rooster Ridge to find Duan Keye.

Tie Mole, the protagonist of Datang Youxia Zhuan, is nominated to be the chief of the wulin (martial artists' community) for his chivalrous actions. He faces competition from Mou Shijie, who, despite being a relative newcomer, comes from a prestigious background. Wishing to maintain friendly ties with Mou Shijie and appease those previously loyal to his rival Wang Botong, Tie Mole gives up competing for the position.

When Tang government forces attack Golden Rooster Ridge, Duan Keye wrongly accuses Shi Ruomei of being a spy, causing her to leave in anger. Nie Yinniang later helps to resolve their misunderstanding by telling the truth to Duan Keye, who regrets his actions and tries to find Shi Ruomei to patch up with her.

Meanwhile, Shi Ruomei is attacked by Tang soldiers after she leaves Golden Rooster Ridge, but is saved by Dugu Yu, a wandering swordsman. While Shi Ruomei is recuperating at Dugu Yu's house, Dugu Ying, Dudu Yu's sister, falls in love with Shi Ruomei, not knowing that Shi Ruomei is actually a woman in disguise as a man. After recovering, Shi Ruomei leaves the Dugus and goes to Chang'an to find Nie Yinniang.

On the other hand, while searching for Shi Ruomei, Duan Keye encounters Shi Chaoying, Shi Siming's daughter, and gets captured. Shi Siming tries to force Duan Keye to join him in rebelling against the Tang government, but Duan Keye refuses. Shi Chaoying is an apprentice of Xin Zhigu, the former lover of Kongkong'er. She has a crush on Duan Keye at first, but gives up on him and turns to Mou Shijie eventually. Duan Keye finally reunites with Shi Ruomei, resolves their past differences with her, and they become lovers.

Qin Xiang, a Tang general descended from Qin Shubao, organises a wulin gathering, but gets wrongly accused of treason by corrupt officials and ends up being imprisoned. Tie Mole, Duan Keye, Shi Ruomei and others who attend the gathering run into trouble, but they are saved by Kongkong'er and Princess Changle. Tie Mole finally avenges his father by slaying Yang Mulao, who had murdered his father.

Meanwhile, Mou Shijie starts revealing his ambition to dominate the wulin. He abandons his lover, Nie Yinniang, and contacts Shi Siming's former followers to join him in rebelling against the Tang government. When his plan fails, he lies to his uncle, Mou Canglang, a reputable and powerful martial artist, and tricks his uncle into helping him. Mou Canglang fights with Duan Keye, Kongkong'er and Xin Zhigu and injures them. However, after learning the truth, he regrets trusting his nephew and switches sides to help Duan Keye and his allies.

Mou Shijie's hypocrisy is revealed during another wulin gathering, causing him to fall from grace and end up taking his own life. Tie Mole becomes the new chief of the wulin. In the meantime, Duan Keye is captured by Shi Chaoying, who is pregnant with Mou Shijie's child, and she wants to use Duan Keye as a hostage to ensure that her child will not be harmed. Shi Ruomei locates Duan Keye after a long search and they are reunited, while Shi Chaoying commits suicide after giving birth to her son. At the end of the novel, Duan Keye and Shi Ruomei are married, fulfilling the arrangement made by their parents.

References 

 

Novels by Liang Yusheng
Novels set in the Tang dynasty